The 2010–11 Korfball Europa Cup is the main korfball competition for clubs in Europe played in the season 2010-2011.

First round
The first round took place in the weekend of 24–26 September in Wrocław (Poland)

5th place

Final round
The final round is held in Hungary in January 2011, with the champions of the Netherlands -Koog Zaandijk-, Belgium -Scaldis- and host country champions -Szentendre- and the 5 best teams in the first round CK Vacarisses , CC Oeiras , Ceské Budejovice , Adler Rauxel  and Trojans .

7th-8th places

5th-6th places

3rd-4th places

Final

Final standings

External links
Europa Cup 2011 Official Website
Europa Cup 2011 - First round (IKF)
Europa Cup 2011 - Final round (IKF)

Korfball European Cup
Korfball Europa Cup
2010 in korfball